La Meilleraie is an indoor sporting arena located in the city of Cholet, Maine-et-Loire, France.  The arena is part of a larger expo and events center called Le Parc des Expositions de la Meilleraie, which is divided into several sections. The sports arena constitutes the "Red Zone" of the complex.

The capacity of the arena is 5,191 people.  It is currently home to the Cholet Basket basketball team. The building opened in 1987 and was renovated in 2009 at a cost of €250,000.

External links
  Cholet Basket

References

Indoor arenas in France
Basketball venues in France
Sports venues in Maine-et-Loire
Cholet Basket